Nematode dermatitis is a cutaneous condition characterized by widespread folliculitis caused by Ancylostoma caninum.

See also 
 Skin lesion

References 

Parasitic infestations, stings, and bites of the skin